Penélope Cruz is a Spanish actress known for her performances in film and television. She is known for her frequent collaborations with Spanish filmmaker Pedro Almodóvar and won the Academy Award for Best Supporting Actress for her performance in Woody Allen's Vicky Cristina Barcelona (2008). She is the first Spanish actress to have been nominated for an Academy Award, as well as the first and only Spanish actress to have received the award.

Major associations

Academy Awards

British Academy Film Awards

Cannes Film Festival

Golden Globe Awards

Primetime Emmy Awards

Screen Actors Guild Awards

Venice Film Festival

Other awards

AACTA International Awards

César Awards

Critics' Choice Awards

David di Donatello Awards

European Film Awards

Feroz Awards

Forqué Awards

Goya Awards

Hollywood Film Festival

Independent Spirit Awards

Miami International Film Festival

Palm Springs International Film Festival

Platino Awards

San Sebastián International Film Festival

Santa Barbara International Film Festival

Satellite Awards

Critics Associations

Alliance of Women Film Journalists Award

Austin Film Critics Association Award

Black Reel Awards

Boston Society of Film Critics Awards

Broadcast Film Critics Association Award

Chicago Film Critics Association Awards

Dallas–Fort Worth Film Critics Association Awards

Detroit Film Critics Society awards

Dublin Film Critics' Circle

Houston Film Critics Society Awards

Internet Entertainment Writers Association Awards

International Cinephile Society Award

Iowa Film Critics Awards

Irish Film and Television Award

Kansas City Film Critics Circle Awards

Latino Entertainment Journalists Association Award

Los Angeles Film Critics

Minnesota Film Critics Alliance Awards

National Board of Review Awards

National Society of Film Critics

New York Film Critics Circle Award

New York Film Critics Online Awards

North American Film Critic Association Awards

Online Film Critics Society Award

Paris Film Critics Awards

San Diego Film Critics Society Awards

San Francisco Bay Area Film Critics Circle Awards

Southeastern Film Critics Association Awards

St. Louis Gateway Film Critics Association Awards

Toronto Film Critics Association Awards

Washington D.C. Area Film Critics Associations

External links

References

Lists of awards received by actor